The 49er World Championships are international sailing regattas in the 49er and 49er FX classes organized by the International Sailing Federation. It was first held in 1997. In 2013, the 49er FX class was added to the programme.

The 49er has been an Olympic class since 2000. The 49er FX has been an Olympic class since 2016.

Editions

All-time medal table

49er

49er FX

Medalists

49er Open

49er Men's

49er FX Women's

49er Youth

49er FX Youth

Multiple medallists

49er

49er FX

See also 

 ISAF Sailing World Championships
 International Sailing Federation

References

External links 
 International 49er Class Association
 Sailing competitions

 
Recurring sporting events established in 1997